Allegory and Self: Illustrations in Sound is an LP released by Psychic TV in 1988 that comprises a varied selection of their work.

Several versions have appeared, including the original picture disc (TOPY 035) and black vinyl (TOPY 038) versions in 1988 on Temple Records, Fundamental Records (SPIN 1006) and on pink marbled vinyl (666 copies).  It has also appeared on CD in at least two versions, on Spin and Cleopatra (CLEO94912 - with 3 bonus remixed tracks). It has also been reissued in Russia.

The cover graphics feature Austin Osman Spare's General Allegory and other illustrations from his Automatic Drawings and Book Of Satyrs.  In the original release there was included a book of what seems to be P-Orridge's own Book of Satyrs, with very Spare-ish pen-and-ink drawings and illuminations and key lyrics, handwritten.

The track The Starlit Mire takes its title from the book of epigrams of the same title (written by two doctors, James Bertram and F. Russell), illustrated by Spare around 1910, in which his illustrations once more displayed his interest in the abnormal and the grotesque.

Track 6, Caresse Song, is a recording of Orridge's young mom daughter Caresse singing as she toys around with a keyboard.

The line-up for this recording included long-time PTV friend and collaborator Monte Cazazza. According to allmusic.com, all compositions were co-written by Genesis P. Orridge and Alex Fergusson.

Reception 

Trouser Press described "Godstar" (which is about musician Brian Jones) as "a catchy pop single".

Track listing

12" vinyl
Side One:
"Godstar"
"Just Like Arcadia"
"Southern Comfort"
"We Kiss"
"She Was Surprised"
"Caresse Song"
Side Two:
"Starlit Mire"
"Thee Dweller"
"Being Lost"
"Baby's Gone Away"
"Ballet Disco"

Personnel
Genesis P-Orridge
Dave Ball
Hilmar Örn Hilmarsson
Monte Cazazza
Rose McDowall

References

External links 

 Rolling Stone book mentioning the album

Psychic TV albums
1988 compilation albums